Répcelak is a town in Vas county, Hungary.

Twin towns — sister cities
Répcelak is twinned with:

  Lehnice, Slovakia

External links 
 Street map 

Populated places in Vas County